The 1928 Memorial Cup final was the tenth junior ice hockey championship of the Canadian Amateur Hockey Association. The George Richardson Memorial Trophy champions Ottawa Gunners of the Ottawa City Junior Hockey League in Eastern Canada competed against the Abbott Cup champions Regina Monarchs of the South Saskatchewan Junior Hockey League in Western Canada. In a best-of-three series, held at Arena Gardens and Varsity Arena in Toronto, Ontario, Regina won their 1st Memorial Cup, defeating Ottawa 2 games to 1.

Scores
Game 1: Regina 4-3 Ottawa
Game 2: Ottawa 2-1 Regina
Game 3: Regina 7-1 Ottawa

Winning roster
John Achtzner, Carl Bergl, Len Dowie, Chuck Farrow, Jim Langford, Mush March, G. Parron, Harold Shaw, Swede Williamson.  Coach: Howie Milne

References

External links
 Memorial Cup
 Canadian Hockey League

Mem
Ice hockey competitions in Toronto
Memorial Cup tournaments
1928 in Ontario
1920s in Toronto